Ambrief is a commune in the department of Aisne in the Hauts-de-France region of northern France.

Geography
Ambrief is located some 10 km southeast of Soissons and 30 km northeast of Villers-Cotterêts. It can be accessed on the D951 road from the north which passes through the village and continues south to Chacrise. The D6 road forms the northeastern border of the commune.  There are also several country roads linking the village to the west and a country road going to the east. There is an area of forest on the eastern side of the village however the rest of the commune is entirely farmland. There are no other villages or hamlets and no identifiable waterways in the commune.

Neighbouring communes and villages

History
Ambrief was a centre for the Knights Templar.

Administration

List of successive mayors of Ambrief

Population

Distribution of age groups

Percentage distribution of age groups in Ambrief and Aisne department in 2017

Sources: INSEE

Sites and monuments

Remains of the "Temple Farm" which was closely related to the commandery of Mount Soissons.
Many remains of cave dwellings

Notable people linked to the commune
Nicolas Bertin (1752-1816), General of the French Revolution, born in Ambrief and died at La Ferté-Milon.

See also
Communes of the Aisne department

References

External links
Ambrief official website 
Ambrief on the old IGN website 
40000 bell towers website 
Ambrief on Géoportail, National Geographic Institute (IGN) website 
Ambrief on the 1750 Cassini Map

Communes of Aisne